Brian Rooney may refer to:

 Brian Rooney (actor) (born 1972), Australian actor
 Brian Charles Rooney, American actor and singer
 Brian L. Rooney (born 1970), American murderer
 Brian Rooney (journalist), American television news correspondent, son of Andy Rooney
 Brian Rooney, Iraq war veteran and candidate in the United States House of Representatives elections in Michigan, 2010

See also
Rooney (surname)